Pabung Syam is a 2021 Indian Meitei language documentary film directed by Haobam Paban Kumar. It is produced by Films Division of India. The film was selected in the non-feature section of the Indian Panorama at the 52nd International Film Festival of India 2021. It won the Best Biographical Film award at the 68th National Film Awards.

It was also screened at the 17th Mumbai International Film Festival for Documentary, Short Fiction and Animation films (MIFF) 2022. The film was screened at the 8th International Film Festival of Shimla 2022.

Synopsis
The film takes a look at the life and work of Pabung Aribam Syam Sharma through the eyes of one of his admirers and students.

Accolades

References

Meitei-language films
2021 films
Cinema of Manipur
Indian documentary films
Indian biographical films